James Otis Jr. (February 5, 1725 – May 23, 1783) was an American lawyer, political activist, colonial legislator, and early supporter of patriotic causes in Massachusetts at the beginning of the Revolutionary Era. Otis was a fervent opponent of the writs of assistance imposed by Great Britain on the American colonies in the early 1760s that allowed law enforcement officials to search property without cause. He later expanded his criticism of British authority to include tax measures that were being enacted by Parliament. As a result, Otis is often incorrectly credited with coining the slogan "taxation without representation is tyranny".

Otis was a mentor to Samuel Adams, and his oratorical style inspired a young John Adams. Due to his early influence in events leading up to the Revolution, Otis was recognized by some as a Founding Father. However, Otis was plagued by mental illness and alcoholism, and by the early 1770s, his erratic behavior had rendered him inconsequential and embarrassing to the cause.

Early life
Otis was born in West Barnstable, Massachusetts, the second of 13 children and the first to survive infancy. His sister, Mercy, and his brothers, Joseph and Samuel, were leaders during the American Revolution, as was a nephew, Harrison Gray Otis.  His father, Colonel James Otis Sr., was a prominent lawyer and militia officer. Father and son had a tumultuous relationship. His father sent him a letter articulating his disappointments and encouraging him to seek God's righteousness to better himself.

In 1755, Otis married Ruth Cunningham, a merchant's daughter and heiress to a fortune worth £10,000. Their politics were quite different, yet they were attached to each other.  Otis later "half-complained that she was a 'High Tory,'" yet in the same breath declared that "she was a good Wife, and too good for him", in the words of John Adams. The marriage produced children James, Elizabeth, and Mary. Their son James died at age 18. Their elder daughter Elizabeth was a Loyalist like her mother; she married Captain Brown of the British Army and lived in England for the rest of her life. Their younger daughter Mary married Benjamin Lincoln, son of the distinguished Continental Army General Benjamin Lincoln.

Writs of assistance
Otis graduated from Harvard in 1743 and rose to the top of the Boston legal profession. In 1760, he received a prestigious appointment as Advocate General of the Admiralty Court. He promptly resigned, however, when Governor Francis Bernard failed to appoint his father to the promised position of Chief Justice of the province's highest court; the position instead went to Otis's longtime opponent Thomas Hutchinson.

In the 1761 case Paxton v. Gray, a group of outraged Boston businessmen which included Ezekiel Goldthwait engaged Otis to challenge the legality of "writs of assistance" before the Superior Court, the predecessor of the Massachusetts Supreme Judicial Court. These writs enabled the authorities to enter any home with no advance notice, no probable cause, and no reason given.

Otis considered himself a loyal subject to the Crown, yet he argued against the writs of assistance in a nearly five-hour oration before a select audience in the State House in February 1761. His argument failed to win his case, but it galvanized the revolutionary movement. 

John Adams recollected years later: "Otis was a flame of fire; with a promptitude of classical allusions, a depth of research, a rapid summary of historical events and dates, a profusion of legal authorities." Adams promoted Otis as a major player in the coming of the Revolution, writing nearly 50 years later: "Then and there was the first scene of the first Act of opposition to the Arbitrary claims of Great Britain. Then and there the Child Independence was born. ... The seeds of Patriots & Heroes ... were then & there sown."

The text of his 1761 speech was much enhanced by Adams on several occasions; it was first printed in 1773 and in longer forms in 1819 and 1823. According to James R. Ferguson, the four tracts that Otis wrote during 1764–65 reveal contradictions and even intellectual confusion. Otis was the first leader of the period to develop distinctive American theories of constitutionalism and representation, but he relied on traditional views of Parliamentary authority. He refused to follow the logical direction of his natural law theory by drawing back from radicalism, according to Ferguson, who feels that Otis appears inconsistent. Samuelson, on the other hand, argues that Otis should be seen as a practical political thinker rather than a theorist, and that explains why his positions changed as he adjusted to altered political realities and exposed the constitutional dilemmas of colonial parliamentary representation and the relationship between Great Britain and the North American colonies.

In 1764, Otis expanded his argument in a pamphlet stating that because Americans lacked proper Parliamentary representation, it was unconstitutional for Parliament to tax Americans.
Some academics have noted Otis' opinion in favor of a court or judge's having it as their duty to review and strike down a law contrary to the written constitution in effect. In the Writs case, Otis said that "An Act against the constitution is void..... and if an act of Parliament should be made..... the executive courts must pass such acts into disuse."

Otis did not identify himself as a revolutionary; his peers, too, generally viewed him as more cautious than the incendiary Samuel Adams. Otis, at times, counseled against the mob violence of the radicals and argued against Adams's proposal for a convention of all the colonies resembling that of the Glorious Revolution of 1688. Yet, on other occasions, Otis exceeded Adams in rousing passions and exhorting people to action. He even called his compatriots to arms at a town meeting on September 12, 1768, according to some accounts. He was a Freemason.

Pamphleteer

Otis was originally in the rural Popular Party, but he effectively made alliances with Boston merchants and grew in popularity after the controversy of the Writs of Assistance case. He subsequently wrote several important patriotic pamphlets, served in the assembly, and was a leader of the Stamp Act Congress. He also was friends with Thomas Paine, the author of Common Sense.
He was banished from Cambridge, Massachusetts, to Watertown in 1743.

Otis asserted that Blacks had inalienable rights, and he favored extending the freedoms of life, liberty, and property to them. The idea of racial equality also permeates his Rights of the British Colonies (1764), in which he states:

Mental health decline

Otis suffered from increasingly erratic behavior as the 1760s progressed. He received a gash on the head from tax collector John Robinson's cudgel at the British Coffee House in 1769. 
Some attribute Otis's mental illness to this event alone, but John Adams, Thomas Hutchinson, and many others mention his mental illness well before 1769. 

The blow to the head probably made it worse and, shortly after, he could no longer continue his work. By the end of the decade, Otis's public life largely came to an end, though he was able to do occasional legal practice during times of clarity. The decline in Otis's mental health was noted by friends and foes alike. In February 1771, John Adams wrote that Otis was "raving mad, raving against father, wife, brother, sister, friend." 

Thomas Hutchinson wrote to Governor Bernard in December 1771 that "Otis was carried off today in a postchaise, bound hand and foot. He has been as good as his word—set the Province in a flame and perished in the attempt." Otis spent the remainder of his life battling mental illness while living with friends and family in the Massachusetts countryside. Massachusetts Governor John Hancock held a dinner in his honor in 1783, but the event was too much for Otis's fragile mental state and he returned to the countryside.

Later life and death

Near the end of his life, Otis burned the majority of his papers without explanation. Historians and biographers have access to his published papers, but this act prevented deeper insights into his life and thoughts that are available for other historical figures. On May 23, 1783, Otis died as a result of being struck by lightning while watching a thunderstorm from the doorway of a friend's home.

Selected published works
 The Rudiments of Latin Prosody (1760). Otis published the first of two treatises on prosody, and his alma mater Harvard eventually adapted it as a textbook.
 A Vindication of the Conduct of the House of Representatives (1762). The first political publication by Otis. Here he uses an example of an expenditure not sanctioned by the colonial legislature as the foundation of his theory that taxes can be charged only by a representative government. In effect, he summarizes the argument that held a central place in Revolutionary rhetoric.
 The Rights of the British Colonies Asserted and Proved (1764). This pamphlet sets down another important philosophy underpinning the Revolutionary debate: it asserts that rights are not derived from human institutions, but from nature and God. Thus, government does not exist to please monarchs but to promote the good of the entire society.
 Considerations on Behalf of the Colonists (1765). This pamphlet expands the author's argument from The Rights of the British Colonies Asserted and Proved. He furthers the notion of natural rights by linking it to the theory of equal representation. In this year, he also authored the pamphlets Vindication of the British Colonies and Brief Remarks on the Defence of the Halifax Libel, Otis's last, in which he grants Parliament complete authority over the colonies. Scholars have settled on two explanations for his drastic reversal: either he temporarily became mentally ill, or he intended to use these pieces to defend himself against charges of treason.

References

Further reading

 Breen, T. H. "Subjecthood and Citizenship: The Context of James Otis's Radical Critique of John Locke," New England Quarterly (Sep., 1998) 71#3, pp. 378–403 in JSTOR
 Brennan, Ellen E. "James Otis: Recreant and Patriot," New England Quarterly (1939) 12:691–725 in JSTOR
 Clancy, Thomas K., "The Importance of James Otis," 82 Miss. L.J. 487 (2013).
 Farrell, James M. "The Writs of Assistance and Public Memory: John Adams and the Legacy of James Otis," New England Quarterly  (2006) 79#4 pp. 533–556 in JSTOR
 Ferguson, James R. "Reason in Madness: The Political Thought of James Otis," William and Mary Quarterly, (1979): 36(2):194–214. in JSTOR
 Frese, Joseph R. "James Otis and the Writs of Assistance," New England Quarterly 30 (1957) 30:496–508 in JSTOR
 Pencak, William. "Otis, James" in American National Biography Online Feb. 2000
 Samuelson, Richard A. "The Constitutional Sanity of James Otis: Resistance Leader and Loyal Subject," Review of Politics (Summer, 1999), 61#3 pp. 493–523 in JSTOR
 Shipton, Clifford K. Sibley's Harvard Graduates, vol. 11 (1960), pp. 247–87, a short scholarly biography
 * Tudor, William. (1823). The Life of James Otis, of Massachusetts: Containing Also, Notices of Some Contemporary Characters and Events, from the Year 1760 to 1775. Boston, MA: Wells and Lilly.
 Waters, John J. Jr., The Otis Family in Provincial and Revolutionary Massachusetts (1968)

External links

 
 Full text of James Otis, the Pre-Revolutionist by John Clark Ridpath, from Project Gutenberg

 The Collected Political Writings of James Otis. Edited and with an Introduction by Richard Samuelson from Liberty Fund Library (2015)

1725 births
1783 deaths
Accidental deaths in Massachusetts
Deaths from lightning strikes
Harvard University alumni
Massachusetts lawyers
Members of the colonial Massachusetts House of Representatives
Otis family
People from Barnstable, Massachusetts
People of Massachusetts in the American Revolution
18th-century American writers
Burials at Granary Burying Ground
American male journalists
People of colonial Massachusetts
18th-century American male writers
18th-century American politicians
Patriots in the American Revolution